This is a list of women's football clubs in Nigeria. NWFL Premiership (formerly Nigeria Women Premier League) is the highest division for female football in Nigeria. NWFL Championship (formerly Nigeria Women Pro-league) and NWFL Nationwide leagues are on the second and third tier on the pyramid respectively. This list is valid for the 2016 football season. Women Amateur Football Association (WAFU) is an independent amateur league for women's football in the country.

List

Nigeria Women Premier League teams

Nigeria Women Pro-league teams

Women Amateur Football Association teams

Nigerian Women's Cup participating teams

Defunct teams

References 

Nigeria